The Bystry Tanyp or Tanyp (Tere Tanıp, Eteź Tanıp), is a river in Bashkortostan and Perm Krai in Russia, a right tributary of the Belaya. The Bystry Tanyp freezes up in the first half of November and remains icebound until April.

References

Rivers of Bashkortostan
Rivers of Perm Krai